The Richardson–Lucy algorithm, also known as Lucy–Richardson deconvolution, is an iterative procedure for recovering an underlying image that has been blurred by a known point spread function. It was named after William Richardson and Leon B. Lucy, who described it independently.

Description
When an image is produced using an optical system and detected using photographic film or a charge-coupled device, for instance, it is inevitably blurred, with an ideal point source not appearing as a point but being spread out into what is known as the point spread function.  Extended sources can be decomposed into the sum of many individual point sources, thus the observed image can be represented in terms of a transition matrix p operating on an underlying image:

In general, a matrix whose elements are  describes the portion of light from source pixel j that is detected in pixel i. In most good optical systems (or in general, linear systems that are described as shift invariant) the transfer function p can be expressed simply in terms of the spatial offset between the source pixel j and the observation pixel i: 

where  is called a point spread function. In that case the above equation becomes a convolution. This has been written for one spatial dimension, but of course most imaging systems are two dimensional, with the source, detected image, and point spread function all having two indices. So a two dimensional detected image is a convolution of the underlying image with a two dimensional point spread function  plus added detection noise.

where

Writing this more generally for two (or more) dimensions in terms of convolution with a point spread function P:

In problems where the point spread function  is not known a priori, a modification of the Richardson–Lucy algorithm has been proposed, in order to accomplish blind deconvolution.

Derivation

In the context of fluorescence microscopy, the probability of measuring a set of number of photons (or digitalization counts proportional to detected light)  for expected values  for a detector with  pixels is given by

it is convenient to work with  since in the context of maximum likelihood estimation we want to find the position of the maximum of the likelihood function and we are not interested in its absolute value.

Again since  is a constant, it will not give any additional information regarding the position of the maximum, so let's consider

Now let's consider that  comes from a ground truth  and a measurement  which we assume to be linear. Then

where a matrix multiplication is implied. We can also write this in the form

where we can see how , mixes or blurs the ground truth.

Where  stands for a -dimensional gradient. If we work on the derivative of  we get

and if we now use we get

But we can also note that  by definition of transpose matrix. And hence

Let's now propose the following arbitrary and key step

Using and  we can rewrite as

which yields

Where division refers to element-wise matrix division and  operates as a matrix but the division and the product (implicit after ) are element-wise. Also,  can be calculated because we assume

- The initial guess  is known (and is typically set to be the experimental data)
    
- The measurement function  is known

On the other hand  is the experimental data. Therefore, equation applied successively, provides an algorithm to estimate our ground truth  by ascending (since it moves in the direction of the gradient of the likelihood) in the likelihood landscape. It has not been demonstrated in this derivation that it converges and no dependence on the initial choice is shown. Note that equation provides a way of following the direction that increases the likelihood but the choice of the log-derivative is arbitrary. On the other hand equation introduces a way of weighting the movement from the previous step in the iteration. Note that if this term was not present in  then the algorithm would output a movement in the estimation even if . It's worth noting that the only strategy used here is to maximize the likelihood at all cost, so artifacts on the image can be introduced. It is worth noting that no prior knowledge on the shape of the ground truth  is used in this derivation.

Software
 RawTherapee (since v.2.3)

See also
 Deconvolution
 Wiener filter (deconvolution in the presence of additive noise)

References

Image processing
Estimation theory